Thomas Irwin may refer to:

Arts and entertainment
 Thomas Caulfield Irwin (1823–1892), Irish poet, writer and classical scholar
 Tom Irwin (actor) (born 1956), American film, television, and stage actor
 Tom Irwin or "Shotgun Tom" Kelly (born 1949), American radio and television personality

Sports
 Tom Irwin (dual player) (1873–1956), Irish Gaelic footballer, hurler, referee and Gaelic games administrator
 Tommy Irwin (baseball) (1912–1996), baseball player
 Tommy Irwin (footballer) (born 1932), Scottish footballer

Others
 Thomas Irwin (American politician) (1785–1870), U.S. representative from Pennsylvania
 Thomas Irwin (Canadian politician) (1889–1962), Canadian member of the House of Commons in 1957–1958
 Thomas Irwin (trade unionist) (died 1941 or 1942), British trade unionist and politician

See also
 Tommy Irvin (1929–2017), U.S. official in Georgia
 Thomas Urwin (disambiguation)